Irene Stelling  (born 25 July 1971) is a Danish former football forward. She played for the Denmark women's national football team at the 1991 FIFA Women's World Cup, and 1996 Summer Olympics.

See also
 Denmark at the 1996 Summer Olympics

References

External links
 
Women's Olympic Rosters Soccer America, 18 July 1996
https://www.washingtonpost.com/archive/sports/1995/06/04/womens-world-cup-95-sweden/ad46f472-3c83-4128-b2f5-eb87ffcad7ec/
http://www.socceramerica.com/article/14681/college-nscaaumbro-division-i-womens-all-americ.html
 http://articles.courant.com/1995-02-03/sports/9502030380_1_fifa-women-s-world-championship-women-s-soccer-national-teams
 https://issuu.com/hartfordhawks/docs/2010_guide/56

1971 births
Living people
Danish women's footballers
Denmark women's international footballers
Place of birth missing (living people)
Footballers at the 1996 Summer Olympics
VSK Aarhus (women) players
Olympic footballers of Denmark
Women's association football forwards
Expatriate women's soccer players in the United States
Hartford Hawks women's soccer players
1991 FIFA Women's World Cup players